Tribrach can refer to:

Tribrach (poetry), a metrical foot of three short syllables.
Tribrach (instrument), a device used in surveying for mounting an instrument on a surveyor's tripod.